Coptic is a Unicode block used with the Greek and Coptic block to write the Coptic language. Prior to version 4.1 of the Unicode Standard, Greek and Coptic was used exclusively to write Coptic text, but Greek and Coptic letter forms are contrastive in many scholarly works, necessitating their disunification. Any specifically Coptic letters in the Greek and Coptic block are not reproduced in the Coptic Unicode block.

Block

History
The following Unicode-related documents record the purpose and process of defining specific characters in the Coptic block:

References 

Coptic language
Unicode blocks